Harecourte is a surname. Notable people with the surname include:

Michael Harecourte, MP for Tamworth (UK Parliament constituency)
Robert Harecourte, MP for Tamworth (UK Parliament constituency)